Ruthless is the tenth studio album by American country music artist Gary Allan. It was released on MCA Nashville on June 25, 2021. It is Allan's first album of new material in over eight years.

History
Between 2015 and 2020, Allan released a number of singles that did not appear on albums due to their poor chart performance. In May 2021, he previewed the track "Temptation" online, and announced that his new album would be coming out in June.

Allan co-produced the album with Tony Brown, Mark Wright, Greg Droman, and Jay Joyce. He recorded over thirty songs in multiple sessions and selected thirteen songs from these sessions to make up the album. Many of the musicians who played on Allan's 1999 album Smoke Rings in the Dark also contributed. The album's lead single, "Waste of a Whiskey Drink", was released in December 2020.

Track listing

Charts

References

2021 albums
MCA Records albums
Gary Allan albums
Albums produced by Jay Joyce
Albums produced by Greg Droman
Albums produced by Mark Wright (record producer)
Albums produced by Tony Brown (record producer)